Simon Nagel (born 5 July 1985) is a Danish retired professional football midfielder.

He joined Vejle Boldklub on 29 June 2014 from Viborg FF, but left again in the summer 2017.

References

External links

National team profile
Career statistics at Danmarks Radio

1985 births
Living people
Danish men's footballers
Denmark youth international footballers
Denmark under-21 international footballers
Silkeborg IF players
Viborg FF players
AC Horsens players
Vendsyssel FF players
Danish Superliga players
Association football midfielders
People from Lolland Municipality
Kjellerup IF players
Sportspeople from Region Zealand